St. Martin is the name of a Catholic parish and church in Idstein, Rheingau-Taunus-Kreis, Germany. The name of the parish became St. Martin Idsteiner Land on 1 January 2017, when it was merged with five other parishes. The parish is part of the Diocese of Limburg.

St. Martin is the patron saint of Idstein, to whom a Gothic church was dedicated in 1330. The present building, designed by architect Johannes Krahn, was consecrated in 1965. It replaced a church built in 1888 in Gothic Revival style and dedicated to Mary Magdalene. The earlier church was too small for the congregation growing after World War II.

After restoration in 2003, a new organ was installed in 2006. Church music in services and concerts, performed by several groups including a children's choir and ensembles playing historic instruments, have received attention in the Rhein-Main Region.

History of the parish St. Martin 
The beginning of Christianity in Idstein is not documented. When the Idstein Castle was first mentioned in 1102, the area belonged to the Diocese of Trier. Idstein possibly had a church in Romanesque style, which was replaced in 1330 by a Gothic church dedicated to St. Martin, the patron saint of Idstein. It was the church of a  founded in 1333 for six canons, and became the Protestant church with the Reformation, named  in 1917.

During the Reformation, Idstein became Lutheran beginning in 1540 under . The last Catholic canon left the town in 1553, which then had no Catholic congregation until the beginning of the 19th century. In 1806, Frederick Augustus, Duke of Nassau allowed the practice of the Catholic cult again. Thirteen families were permitted to use the chapel of the Schloss. The dukedom became part of the Kingdom of Prussia in 1866. In 1884, the minister Wilhelm Schilo began the building of a church for a growing congregation, collecting money all over Germany. The architect Aloys Vogt, from the local  (School for building trades), designed a hall church with two aisles in Gothic Revival style, built from 1887 to 1888. The building, seating 135 people, was dedicated to Mary Magdalene by Bishop  on 8 October 1888. The Catholic population of Idstein grew considerably after World War II, when many refugees and displaced persons moved to Idstein. The  was dynamited in 1963. The building of the new church began in 1963. It was consecrated, again to St. Martin, on 5 June 1965 by Bishop Wilhelm Kempf.

On 1 January 2017, the parish became part of the larger St. Martin Idsteiner Land parish, which includes five other former parishes: Maria Königin in Niedernhausen, St. Nikolaus von Flüe in Idstein-Wörsdorf, St. Martha in Niedernhausen-Engenhahn, St. Michael in Niedernhausen-Oberjosbach and St. Thomas in Waldems. A service was held on 5 February by Wolfgang Rösch.

Construction of the present church 

Professor Johannes Krahn, who built several churches and early skyscrapers such as the Beehive House in Frankfurt am Main, designed a space recalling elements of an early Romanesque Basilica. In a simple shape, a single long nave is concluded by a semicircle choir around the altar. On the right side the wall opens to a side chapel, reminiscent of a transept. The outer walls are sandstone, visible both inside and outside. Light flows in from a band of windows under the plain wooden ceiling. The combination of materials has been compared to Le Corbusier. The building recalls the austere style of sacred architecture of the 1950s.

The floor is of Jura marble, the altar, ambo, baptismal font and tabernacle are made of Lahn marble. The wall behind the altar held a neo-Gothic crucifixion scene of Mary, John, and Mary Magdalene under the cross, from the Magdalenenkirche. Low stained glass windows forming the Stations of the Cross were designed by Paul Corazolla from Berlin. The first organ was built by E. F. Walcker & Cie. and consecrated in 1974. It was placed on the right side in the opening for the chapel, visible to the congregation. The free-standing bell tower, housing four bells, is 42 m high.

Restoration in 2003 
The walls of the church were completely restored in 2003. At the same time the altar was moved closer to the congregation, making more room for the choir. The baptismal font was relocated from the chapel to the front, opposite the ambo. The tabernacle, which had been where the baptismal font is now, and the crucifixion scene were moved to the chapel, creating a chapel for adoration. The restoration works were directed by Franz Josef Hamm from Limburg. The new cross above the altar was created by a group of young people in preparation for confirmation. During the restoration the organ had to be taken apart. The parish decided not to restore it but to have a new organ built.

Mebold organ and concerts 

The organ was built by Orgelbau Mebold and consecrated on 22 January 2006. The instrument has 1,888 pipes and 33 stops on two manuals and a pedalboard. The layout of its great division reflects the classic organ construction of the Baroque period, whilst the swell division (or swell box) has the timbre of the Romantic, which makes it possible to play a wide range of the organ repertoire from different eras. The first organ concert on the Mebold organ was played by Dan Zerfaß, organist of the Worms Cathedral. The organ is used mostly in services, but has been played in concerts of artists such as Kalevi Kiviniemi. In 2005 Graham Waterhouse was the soloist in the premiere of his Cello Concerto in the chamber version on 5 August 2005. Giora Feidman and Matthias Eisenberg performed a duo programme on 14 November 2008. Christian Schmitt played in 2007 with the chamber choir of the Hochschule für Musik und Darstellende Kunst Frankfurt, conducted by Wolfgang Schäfer, who returned in 2010 to conduct the Frankfurter Kammerchor.

Church music 

The church choir was named  in 1973. The Martinis were founded in 1988 by Thomas Gabriel as a youth choir.

The repertory includes motets such as Bohuslav Matěj Černohorský's Laudetur Jesus Christus, Kuhnau's Tristis est anima mea, Rheinberger's Abendlied and Bruckner's Locus iste.

The groups have also included contemporary music, such as that by Heinz Werner Zimmermann, Pärt's De profundis, Barber's , Sandström's , and Whitacre's .

Concerts and services have also been performed by guest ensembles such as the Ukrainian chamber choir OREYA. The choirs of St. Martin travelled to England in 2006 to attend services and evensong in Christ Church, Oxford, Salisbury Cathedral and St Paul's Cathedral, London. In 2016, they performed at the Cathedral the premiere of the oratorio Laudato si' with the choirs of Liebfrauen, Frankfurt, conducted by the composer Peter Reulein. The performance was repeated at the Frankfurt Cathedral in 2017.

On 26 December 2019, the Hessian broadcaster hr4 broadcast a Christmas service, in which a project choir of mostly choir members performed Rutter's Angels' Carol and Christmas Lullaby, among others.

Abendlob 
In addition to singing in mass on Sundays and feast days, the choirs added irregular liturgies of Abendlob, in the tradition of the Anglican Evensong, singing psalms, Magnificat and Nunc dimittis. An Abendlob on the occasion of the Kreuzfest (Feast of the Cross) in 2018 had Psalm 100 set by Charles Villiers Stanford, Magnificat and Nunc dimittis in D by Charles Wood, Mozart's Ave verum corpus and Rheinberger's Abendlied. An Abendlob in Advent 2019 contained, among others, Hammerschmidt's Machet die Tore weit, Hassler's Dixit Maria, Vivaldi's Magnificat, RV 610, and Biebl's Ave Maria.

Choral concerts 

An annual choral concert with soloists and orchestra has been performed by the combined choirs. The specialized orchestras La Beata Olanda (Freiburg), Antichi Strumenti (Mulhouse), Main-Barockorchester Frankfurt and L'arpa festante /Munich) accompanied works by Bach, Buxtehude, Handel, Haydn and Schütz in historically informed performances, also the church's groups Capella lignea and Barock-Consort St. Martin. Several concerts were collaborations with other choirs: the choir of the Protestant church of Geisenheim and the Idsteiner Kantorei (the choir of the Unionskirche), conducted by Kantor Carsten Koch from 2003.

In the following table, the regular conductor Franz Fink is not mentioned, only the guest conductor when conductors shared a performance.

References

External links 
 
 St. Martin Idstein website
 St. Martin Idsteiner Land website
 Katholische Kirche St. Martin (in German, pictured) taunus.info
 Gründungsvereinbarung der Pfarrei St. Martin - Idsteiner Land (in German) St. Martin 2017
 Ökumene: In Idstein sind sich Protestanten und Katholiken so nah wie kaum irgendwo Wiesbadener Kurier 14 June 2017
 

Roman Catholic churches completed in 1965
Roman Catholic churches in Hesse
Rheingau-Taunus-Kreis
Churches in the Diocese of Limburg
20th-century Roman Catholic church buildings in Germany